Joy Again is an American indie rock band from Philadelphia, Pennsylvania. The band consists of singer and guitarist Sachi DiSerafino, singer and guitarist Arthur Shea, keyboardist Blaise O'Brien, bassist Kieran Ferris, keyboardist Zachary Tyndall, and drummer Will Butera. The group was originally managed by Shamir and signed to Lucky Number Records, but are now signed to Arista Records

Joy Again released their first album in 2014 titled Forever. The album consists of 30 songs. The band released a self-titled EP in 2017. In 2019, the band released their second EP titled Piano. The band opened for Snail Mail on a portion of their 2022 tour.

In January 2023, the band's single "Looking Out For You", originally released in 2015, was certified Silver in the UK by the British Phonographic Industry (BPI) for selling 200,000 equivalent units.

References

Musical groups from Philadelphia